Docidoceras is an extinct ammonite genus from the order Ammonitida that lived during the Middle Jurassic. Docidoceras is included in the family Otoitidae which makes up part of the ammonite superfamily Stephanoceratoidea.

Docidoceras has a broad, finely ribbed, evolute shell with a depressed whorl section. The venter, the outer rim, is broadly arched and crossed by the ribs without interruption. The dorsum, on the inner rim of the whorls is broadly impressed.

Distribution 
Fossils of Docidoceras have been found in:
 Laberge Group, Yukon, Canada
 Agoudim Formation, Morocco
 Andalusia, Spain 
 Inferior Oolite, United Kingdom
 Kialagvik Formation, Alaska, United States

References

Bibliography 
 Arkell et al., 1957; Ammonitina in the Treatise on Invertebrate Paleontology, Part L, Ammonoidea; Geological Soc of America and Univ Kansas press.

Middle Jurassic ammonites
Bajocian life
Middle Jurassic ammonites of Europe
Jurassic Spain
Fossils of Spain
Jurassic United Kingdom
Fossils of England
Ammonites of Africa
Jurassic animals of Africa
Middle Jurassic Africa
Jurassic Morocco
Fossils of Morocco
Jurassic ammonites of North America
Jurassic Canada
Fossils of Canada
Jurassic United States
Fossils of the United States
Ammonitida genera
Stephanoceratoidea